Devane is a surname. Notable people with the surname include: 

Alvin Devane (1923-2012), American policeman
Andrew Devane (1917-2000), Irish architect
Ciarán Devane (born 1962), chief executive of the British Council
Harris DeVane (1963-2018), American stock car racing driver
Jamie Devane (born 1991), Canadian ice hockey player
William Devane (born 1939), American actor